The Netball South Australia Premier League, also referred to as the Netball SA Premier League is a state netball league organised by Netball South Australia. On a national level, the league is effectively a third level league, below Suncorp Super Netball and the Australian Netball League. Between 2008 and 2014, when sponsored by Subway the league was known as the Subway Cup. Between 2015 and 2017 when it was sponsored by Nine News it was known as the Nine News Netball Cup. Previous sponsors include Dairy Farmers and Farmers Union. During the 2010s the league has been dominated by two clubs, Contax and Matrics, who between them have won every Premier Division grand final since 2010.

History

Contax and Garville rivalry
In 1988, with a team that included Michelle den Dekker and Kathryn Harby, Contax won their fourth premiership, defeating Garville in the grand final. This marked the beginning a rivalry between Contax and Garville. Between 1986 and 1996 Contax and Garville contested every state league grand final. The rivalry saw the two clubs compete in nine consecutive state league grand finals, plus one Mobil Super League final, with both clubs winning five finals each. With a team that included Harby and Julie Nykiel, a former Australia women's  basketball international, Contax won their fifth and sixth premierships in 1990 and 1991. Between 1992 and 1995 Garville won four successive state league grand finals before, a Contax team featuring Jacqui Delaney won the club's seventh premiership in 1996.

Premier League era
In 2011 the state league was renamed the Premier League. Since this time, Contax main rival has been Matrics. Between them, Contax and Matrics played in every Premier League grand final during the decade winning 5 Premierships each.

Representative team
The Australian Netball League team Southern Force are effectively the representative team of the Netball South Australia Premier League.  They are one of two teams that represent Netball South Australia in senior or national leagues. Their senior team, Adelaide Thunderbirds, has represented Netball South Australia in both the ANZ Championship and Suncorp Super Netball. Southern Force are also effectively the reserve team of Thunderbirds.

Clubs
The 2020 league featured eight clubs, entering teams in two divisions – the Premier Division and Reserves Division.

Grand finals

Sponsorship

References

External links
 Netball SA Premier League on Facebook

 
Netball in South Australia
South Australia
Southern Force (netball)
Netball